Send Me Your Love may refer to:

 Send Me Your Love (album), a 1984 album by Kashif
 "Send Me Your Love", the title song
 "Send Me Your Love" (Taryn Manning song), 2012
 "Send Me Your Love", a song by  Badfinger from their 1979 album Airwaves
 "Send Me Your Love", a 2016 EP by Mia Wray

See also
 "Sending Me Ur Loving", a 2020 song by the Jungle Giants